The juniper vole (Microtus juldaschi) is a species of rodent in the family Cricetidae.
It is found in Afghanistan, China, Pakistan and Tajikistan. It was formerly classified in the genus Neodon, but genetic evidence indicates that it is classified within the subgenus Blanfordimys in Microtus.

References

Musser, G. G. and M. D. Carleton. 2005. Superfamily Muroidea. pp. 894–1531 in Mammal Species of the World a Taxonomic and Geographic Reference. D. E. Wilson and D. M. Reeder eds. Johns Hopkins University Press, Baltimore.

Neodon
Mammals of Afghanistan
Mammals of Pakistan
Mammals described in 1879
Taxonomy articles created by Polbot
Taxobox binomials not recognized by IUCN